Jacob Levin may refer to:

 Jacob Levin (chess player) (1904–1992), American chess master
 Jacob Levin (footballer) (1890–1945), Swedish football player

See also
Levin (surname)